Osman Beverly France  (October 4, 1858 – May 2, 1947) was a pitcher in Major League Baseball  with the Chicago Colts of the National League.  He pitched two  innings for the Colts on July 14, 1890 in his only Major League appearance. His minor league  career lasted through 1892.

External links

Major League Baseball pitchers
Chicago Colts players
Baseball players from Ohio
1858 births
1947 deaths
19th-century baseball players
Fort Worth Panthers players
Houston Mud Cats players
Seattle (minor league baseball) players
Burlington Hawkeyes players
Tacoma (minor league baseball) players
Sacramento Senators players
Atlanta Firecrackers players
Minneapolis Minnies players
Butte (minor league baseball) players